Radya Nikolayevna Yeroshina (17 September 1930 – 23 September 2012) was a Soviet cross-country skier who competed in the 1950s and 1960s, training at Lokomotiv in Moscow.

She won four Winter Olympic medals with three silvers in the 10 km (1956 and the 3 × 5 km relay (1956, 1960) and a bronze in the 10 km (1960). She also won the 10 km event at the Holmenkollen ski festival in 1958.

Yeroshina also won two medals at the FIS Nordic World Ski Championships with a gold in the 3 × 5 km relay (1958) and a bronze in the 10 km (1962).

Cross-country skiing results

Olympic Games
4 medals – (3 silver, 1 bronze)

World Championships
 2 medals – (1 gold, 1 bronze)

References

External links
 
 

1930 births
2012 deaths
Cross-country skiers at the 1956 Winter Olympics
Cross-country skiers at the 1960 Winter Olympics
Holmenkollen Ski Festival winners
Olympic cross-country skiers of the Soviet Union
Olympic silver medalists for the Soviet Union
Olympic bronze medalists for the Soviet Union
Russian female cross-country skiers
Soviet female cross-country skiers
Olympic medalists in cross-country skiing
FIS Nordic World Ski Championships medalists in cross-country skiing
Medalists at the 1956 Winter Olympics
Medalists at the 1960 Winter Olympics